Western High School may refer:

United States
Western High School (Anaheim, California), Anaheim, California
Western High School (Illinois), Barry, Illinois
Western High School (Florida), Davie, Florida
Western High School (Indiana), Russiaville, Indiana
Western High School (Maryland), Baltimore, Maryland
Western High School (Auburn, Michigan), Auburn, Michigan
Western High School (Parma, Michigan), Parma, Michigan
Western International High School, Detroit, Michigan
Walled Lake Western High School, Commerce Township, Michigan
Western High School (Nevada), Las Vegas, Nevada, part of the Clark County School District
Western High School (New Mexico), Silver City, New Mexico
Western High School (Ohio), Latham, Ohio
Western High School (Paris, Kentucky), Paris, Kentucky
Western High School (Louisville, Kentucky), Louisville, Kentucky, now known as Western MST Magnet High School
Western High School (Washington, D.C.), Washington, D.C., now known as Duke Ellington School of the Arts

Canada 

 Western Canada High School, Calgary, Canada

See also

West High School (disambiguation)
Western (disambiguation)